During his term as President of the United States, Donald Trump made tens of  thousands of false or misleading claims. The Washington Posts fact-checker tallied the number as 30,573 by January 2021, an average of approximately 21 per day by the end of his presidency. The Toronto Star tallied the number of false claims as 5,276 by June 2019, an average of 6.1 per day. Commentators and fact-checkers have described the scale of his mendacity as "unprecedented" in American politics, and the consistency of falsehoods a distinctive part of his business and political identities.

By June 2019, after initially resisting, many news organizations began to describe some of his falsehoods as "lies". The Washington Post said his frequent repetition of claims he knew to be false amounted to a campaign based on disinformation. Trump campaign CEO and presidency chief strategist Steve Bannon said that the press, rather than Democrats, was Trump's primary adversary and "the way to deal with them is to flood the zone with shit."

As part of their attempts to overturn the 2020 U.S. presidential election, Trump and his allies repeatedly falsely claimed there had been massive election fraud and that Trump had won the election. Their effort was characterized by some as an implementation of the big lie propaganda technique.

Veracity and politics
"It has long been a truism that politicians lie," wrote Carole McGranahan for the American Ethnologist journal in 2017. However, "Donald Trump is different" from other politicians, stated McGranahan, citing that Trump is the most "accomplished and effective liar" thus far to have ever participated in American politics. McGranahan felt that "the frequency, degree, and impact of lying in politics are now unprecedented" as a result of Trump.

Presidential historian Douglas Brinkley of Rice University stated that past U.S. presidents have occasionally "lied or misled the country," but none of them were a "serial liar" like Trump. Donnel Stern, writing in the Psychoanalytic Dialogues journal in 2019, declared: "We expect politicians to stretch the truth. But Trump is a whole different animal," because Trump "lies as a policy," and he "will say anything" to satisfy his supporters or himself.

Heidi Taksdal Skjeseth, writing for the Reuters Institute for the Study of Journalism in 2017, described how lies have "always been an integral part of politics and political communication". However, Trump was "delivering untruths on an unprecedented scale" in U.S. politics, both during his presidential campaign and during his presidency. Skjeseth also commented that no one in French politics was comparable to Trump in his provision of falsehoods.

"Fabrications have long been a part of American politics," wrote Sheryl Gay Stolberg in The New York Times in 2017, as several presidents in the previous 50 years have occasionally lied. Stolberg cited that Dwight Eisenhower lied about a U.S. spy plane shot down over the Soviet Union, Lyndon Johnson lied to justify U.S. policies regarding Vietnam, and Bill Clinton lied to conceal his sexual affair. Meanwhile, Stolberg recounts that Richard Nixon was accused of lying in the Watergate scandal, while George W. Bush was accused of lying about the need for the Iraq War (with Donald Trump being one accuser of Bush lying). However, Stolberg states that "President Trump, historians and consultants in both political parties agree, appears to have taken what the writer Hannah Arendt once called 'the conflict between truth and politics' to an entirely new level ... Trump is trafficking in hyperbole, distortion and fabrication on practically a daily basis."

Mark Barabak of the Los Angeles Times described in 2017 that U.S. presidents "of all stripes" have previously misled the public, either accidentally or "very purposefully". Barabak provided examples of Ronald Reagan, who falsely stated that he had filmed Nazi death camps, and Barack Obama, who falsely stated that "if you like your health care plan, you can keep it" under his Affordable Care Act. However, Barabak goes on to state that "White House scholars and other students of government agree there has never been a president like Donald Trump, whose volume of falsehoods, misstatements and serial exaggerations" is unparalleled.

Business career

Real estate 
Within years of expanding his father's property development business into Manhattan in the early 1970s, Trump attracted the attention of The New York Times for his brash and controversial style, with one real-estate financier observing in 1976, "His deals are dramatic, but they haven't come into being. So far, the chief beneficiary of his creativity has been his public image." Der Scutt, the prominent architect who designed Trump Tower, said of Trump in 1976, "He's extremely aggressive when he sells, maybe to the point of overselling. Like, he'll say the convention center is the biggest in the world, when it really isn't. He'll exaggerate for the purpose of making a sale."

A 1984 GQ profile of Trump quoted him stating he owned the whole block on Central Park South and Avenue of the Americas. GQ noted that the two buildings Trump owned in that area were likely less than a sixth of the block.

In a 2005 interview with Golf Magazine, Trump said he was able to purchase Mar-a-Lago in 1985 by first purchasing the beach in front of it, then announcing false plans to build large houses between Mar-a-Lago and the ocean (to lower the price of Mar-a-Lago by blocking its view).

In his 2016–2020 financial reports, he claimed that the Trump Hotel in the Old Post Office Building in Washington, D.C. had revenue of over $150 million. In 2021, the House Oversight and Reform Committee revealed that, to the contrary, the property had a net loss of $70 million during that period.

The New York state attorney general, Letitia James, has opened a civil investigation into Trump's business practices, especially regarding inflated property values. Additionally, she joined the Manhattan district attorney's office in a criminal investigation into possible property tax fraud by the Trump Organization. The company is suspected of significantly misrepresenting its property values: inflating reports to apply for loans, deflating reports to lower tax bills. In February 2022, amid the ongoing civil and criminal probe, Mazars informed the Trump Organization that it would no longer support the accuracy of the previous decade of financial statements it had prepared for the organization, suggesting that the Trump Organization had provided it with false information. Mazars said that, furthermore, it would no longer serve as the accountant for the Trump Organization nor would it file personal tax returns for Donald and Melania Trump.

Other investments and debt 
In 1984, Trump posed as his own spokesman John Barron and made false assertions of his wealth to secure a higher ranking on the Forbes 400 list of wealthy Americans, including by claiming he owned over 90 percent of his family's business. Audio recordings of these claims were released in 2018 by journalist Jonathan Greenberg.

When the stock market crashed in October 1987, Trump told the press he had sold all his stock a month before and taken no losses. But SEC filings showed that he still owned large stakes in some companies. Forbes calculated that Trump had lost $19 million on his Resorts International holdings alone.

Challenging estimates of his net worth he considered too low, in 1989 Trump said he had very little debt. Reuters reported Trump owed $4 billion to more than 70 banks at the beginning of 1990.

In 1997, Ben Berzin Jr., who had been tasked with recovering at least some of the $100 million his bank had lent Trump, said "During the time that I dealt with Mr. Trump, I was continually surprised by his mastery of situational ethics. He does not seem to be able to differentiate between fact and fiction."

A 1998 New York Observer article entitled "Tricky Donald Trump Beats Jerry Nadler in Game of Politics" reported that "Nadler flatly calls Mr. Trump a 'liar'," quoting Nadler stating, "Trump got $6 million [in federal money] in the dead of night when no one knew anything about it" by slipping a provision into a $200 billion federal transportation bill.

During a 2005 deposition in a defamation lawsuit he initiated about his worth, Trump said: "My net worth fluctuates, and it goes up and down with markets and with attitudes and with feelings, even my own feelings... and that can change rapidly from day to day".

Philanthropy 
David Fahrenthold investigated the long history of Trump's claims about his charitable giving and found little evidence the claims are true. Following Fahrenthold's reporting, the Attorney General of New York opened an inquiry into the Donald J. Trump Foundation's fundraising practices, and ultimately issued a "notice of violation" ordering the Foundation to stop raising money in New York. The Foundation had to admit it engaged in self-dealing practices to benefit Trump, his family, and businesses. Fahrenthold won the 2017 Pulitzer Prize in National Reporting for his coverage of Trump's claimed charitable giving and casting "doubt on Donald Trump's assertions of generosity toward charities".

Sports 

In 1983, when Trump was forming a business relationship with the New Jersey Generals football team, he spoke about the team at a public forum. "He promised the signing of superstar players he would never sign. He announced the hiring of immortal coaches he would never hire. He scheduled a news conference the next day to confirm all of it, and the next day never came," CNN reporter Keith Olbermann recalled in 2021. Following the forum, Trump approached Olbermann and, rather than waiting for interview questions, began speaking into Olbermann's microphone about "an entirely different set of coaches and players than he had from the podium."

In 1987, during testimony regarding an antitrust case between the United States Football League (USFL, a spring-time league of which Trump's New Jersey Generals were a franchise team) and the National Football League (NFL), Trump stated that he had had a meeting with NFL commissioner Pete Rozelle several years earlier where Rozelle offered him an NFL franchise in exchange for keeping the USFL a spring-time league and not initiating a lawsuit with the NFL. Rozelle denied having made this offer and stated that he was opposed to Trump becoming an NFL team owner, with a person who was present at the meeting between the two later stating that Rozelle told Trump, "As long as I or my heirs are involved in the NFL, you will never be a franchise owner in the league".

In 1996, Trump claimed he wagered $1 million on 20-to-1 odds in a Las Vegas heavyweight title boxing match between Evander Holyfield and Mike Tyson. The Las Vegas Sun reported that "while everyone is careful not to call Trump a liar," no one in a position to know about such a sizable wager was aware of it.

In a 2004 book, The Games Do Count: America's Best and Brightest on the Power of Sports, Trump claimed to have hit "the winning home run" when his school played Cornwall High School in 1964, garnering a headline "TRUMP HOMERS TO WIN THE GAME" in a local newspaper. Years later, a journalist discovered that Trump's high school did not play Cornwall that year, nor did any such local headline surface. (Furthermore, a classmate recalled a separate incident in high school in which Trump had hit "a blooper the fielders misplayed," sending the ball "just over the third baseman's head," yet Trump insisted to him later: "I want you to remember this: I hit the ball out of the ballpark!" The event had happened at a practice field, not a ballpark.)

After purchasing the Trump National Golf Club in 2009, Trump erected The River of Blood monument between the 14th hole and the 15th tee with a plaque describing the blood of Civil War casualties that turned the river red. No such event ever took place at this site.

Other 
After three Trump casino executives died in a 1989 helicopter crash, Trump claimed that he, too, had nearly boarded the helicopter. The claim was denied 30 years later by a former vice president of the Trump Organization.

Promoting his Trump University after its formation in 2004, Trump asserted he would handpick all its instructors. Michael Sexton, former president of the venture, stated in a 2012 deposition that Trump selected none of the instructors.

During a 2018 interview, television personality Billy Bush recounted a conversation he'd  had with Trump years earlier in which he refuted Trump's repeated false claims that The Apprentice was the top-rated television program in America. Bush recalled Trump responding, "Billy, look, you just tell them and they believe it. That's it: you just tell them and they believe. They just do."

Perceptions 
The architect Philip Johnson said in 1984 that Trump often lied, adding "But it's sheer exuberance, exaggeration. It's never about anything important."

Alair Townsend, a former budget director and deputy mayor of New York City during the 1980s, and a former publisher of Crain's New York Business, said "I wouldn't believe Donald Trump if his tongue were notarized." Leona Helmsley later used this line as her own when she spoke about Trump in her November 1990 interview in Playboy magazine.

Trump often appeared in New York tabloid newspapers. Recalling her career with New York Posts Page Six column, Susany Mulcahy told Vanity Fair in 2004, "I wrote about him a certain amount, but I actually would sit back and be amazed at how often people would write about him in a completely gullible way. He was a great character, but he was full of crap 90 percent of the time." (Trump told the magazine, "I agree with her 100 percent.")

Barbara Res, a former Trump Organization executive vice president who worked for Trump from 1978 until 1998, said "he would tell the staff his ridiculous lies, and after a while, no one believed a single word he would say".

In The Art of the Deal

Tony Schwartz is a journalist who ghostwrote Trump: The Art of the Deal. In July 2016, Schwartz was interviewed by Jane Mayer for two articles in The New Yorker. In them, he described Trump, who was running for president at the time, highly unfavorably, and described how he came to regret writing The Art of the Deal. When Schwartz wrote The Art of the Deal, he created the phrase "truthful hyperbole" as an "artful euphemism" to describe Trump's "loose relationship with the truth". This passage from the book provides the context, written in Trump's voice: "I play to people's fantasies... People want to believe that something is the biggest and the greatest and the most spectacular. I call it truthful hyperbole. It's an innocent form of exaggeration—and it's a very effective form of promotion". He said Trump "loved the phrase".

Schwartz said "deceit" is never "innocent". He added, "'Truthful hyperbole' is a contradiction in terms. It's a way of saying, 'It's a lie, but who cares?'" Schwartz repeated his criticism on Good Morning America and Real Time with Bill Maher, saying he "put lipstick on a pig".

Fearing that anti-German sentiments during and after World War II would negatively affect his business, Trump's father, Fred Trump, began claiming Swedish descent. The falsehood was repeated by Donald to the press and in The Art of the Deal, where he claimed that his grandfather, Friedrich Trump, "came here from Sweden as a child". In the same book, Donald also said his father was born in New Jersey. When asked during his U.S. presidency why he upheld the false narrative about his father being Swedish, Trump said, "My father spent a lot of time [in Sweden]. But it was never really something really discussed very much." Additionally, as president, Trump on at least three occasions claimed his father was born in Germany. Trump's father is of German descent but was born in the Bronx, New York. In one case Trump said his father was "born in a very wonderful place in Germany," and another time stated, "I was raised by the biggest kraut of them all," invoking an ethnic slur for a German (particularly a soldier of either world war). The Guardian pointed out the irony of Trump previously supporting the "birtherism" conspiracy theory asserting Barack Obama was born in Africa.

September 11 attacks

On September 11, 2001, after at least one of the World Trade Center towers was destroyed, Trump gave a telephone interview with WWOR-TV in New York.  He said: "40 Wall Street actually was the second-tallest building in downtown Manhattan, and it was actually, before the World Trade Center, was the tallest—and then, when they built the World Trade Center, it became known as the second tallest, and now it's the tallest." Once the Twin Towers had collapsed, the 71-story Trump Building at 40 Wall Street became the second-tallest building in Lower Manhattan,  shorter than the building at 70 Pine Street.

Two days after the attack, Trump stood near Ground Zero in a suit and tie and told a television station that he was paying over two hundred of his employees to come "find and identify victims". No record of such work has ever been found. Over two decades later, in 2023, he reposted the claim on Truth Social.

At a rally in Columbus, Ohio, in November 2015, Trump said "I have a view—a view in my apartment that was specifically aimed at the World Trade Center." He added "and I watched those people jump and I watched the second plane hit ... His campaign did not respond to inquiries about how it was possible for him to see people jumping from that far away. He still lived in that building when he made his comments at the 2015 rally.

In another rally in 2015 on November 21 in Birmingham, Alabama, Trump claimed seeing "thousands and thousands" of Arab Americans cheering during the collapse of the World Trade Center on the other side of the Hudson River in Jersey City, New Jersey. Several news organizations like the Associated Press (AP), The Washington Post, and The Star-Ledger reported rumors of 9/11 celebrations in New Jersey but they were each found to be "unfounded", unsourced, or finding that people were memorializing the event rather than celebrating it. Nobody else was known to remember seeing masses of thousands of people celebrating after 9/11. Furthermore, Trump, living in Midtown Manhattan would not have been able to hear or see people cheering in New Jersey with a clear view.

Additionally, during his 2016 campaign, Trump falsely claimed to have predicted the attacks in his 2000 book The America We Deserve, as well as that Osama bin Laden was not well known at the time the book was published and that it called for the U.S. to "take him out".

2016 presidential campaign

Trump promoted a number of conspiracy theories that have lacked empirical support. These have included those related to Barack Obama's citizenship from 2011. Known as "birther" theories, these allege that Obama was not born in the U.S. In 2011, Trump took credit for pushing the White House to release Obama's "long-form" birth certificate, while raising doubt about its legitimacy, and in 2016 admitted that Obama was a natural-born citizen from Hawaii. He later falsely stated that Hillary Clinton started the conspiracy theories.

In September 2015, Boing Boing reproduced newspaper articles from 1927, which reported that Trump's father had been arrested that year at a Ku Klux Klan march, though had been discharged. Multiple articles on the incident list Fred Trump's address (in Jamaica, Queens), which he is recorded as sharing with his mother in the 1930 census and a 1936 wedding announcement. Trump, then a candidate for U.S. president, admitted to The New York Times that the address was "where my grandmother lived and my father, early on." Then, when asked about the 1927 story, he denied that his father had ever lived at that address, and said the arrest "never happened", and, "There was nobody charged."

Within six months of Trump's announcement of his presidential campaign, FactCheck.org declared Trump the "King of Whoppers", stating, "In the 12 years of FactCheck.org's existence, we've never seen his match. He stands out not only for the sheer number of his factually false claims, but also for his brazen refusals to admit error when proven wrong."

In 2016, Trump suggested that Ted Cruz's father was involved in the assassination of John F. Kennedy. He also accused Cruz of stealing the Iowa caucuses during the 2016 Republican Party presidential primaries.

During his campaign, Trump claimed that his father, Fred Trump, had given him "a small loan of a million dollars," which he used to build "a company that's worth more than $10 billion," denying Marco Rubio's allegation that he had inherited $200 million from his father. An October 2018 New York Times exposé on Fred and Donald Trump's finances concludes that Donald "was a millionaire by age 8," and that he had received $413 million (adjusted for inflation) from his father's business empire over his lifetime, including over $60 million ($140 million in 2018 currency) in loans, which were largely unreimbursed.

Trump claimed repeatedly on the campaign trail in 2015 that the actual unemployment rate of around 5% "isn't reflective [of reality]... I've seen numbers of 24%, I actually saw a number of 42% unemployment". PolitiFact rated this claim "Pants on Fire," its rating for the most egregious falsehoods. Jeremy Adam Smith, writing for the Greater Good Magazine, said Trump's falsehoods may be "blue lies," which are "told on behalf of a group, that can actually strengthen the bonds among the members of that group". As a result, he posited, Trump's dishonesty does not cause him to lose the support of his political base, even while it "infuriates and confuses almost everyone else".

In November 2015, Buzzfeed News' Andrew Kaczynski reported that Trump, despite having claimed to have the best memory in the world, actually had a history of "conveniently forgetting" people or organizations in ways that benefit him. In July 2016, PolitiFact's Linda Qiu also pointed out that despite Trump's boast for his memory, he "seems to suffer bouts of amnesia when it comes to his own statements". Both Kaczynski and Qiu cited examples of Trump's stating he did not know anything about former Ku Klux Klan leader David Duke, despite past statements showing he clearly knew who Duke was.

Over three months before the 2016 presidential election, Trump claimed the election was going to be "rigged".

Border wall with Mexico

Throughout his campaign and into his presidency, President Trump repeatedly claimed that the US would "build the wall and make Mexico pay for it". President of Mexico Enrique Peña Nieto said that his country would not pay for the wall, and ultimately never did. While not unusual for a campaign promise to not pan out, Trump's insistence that Mexico would pay for it was a central element of his campaign and continued for years afterward. At the February 2020 Conservative Political Action Conference, Trump again reiterated that Mexico would be paying for the wall, saying, "Mexico is paying for it and it's every bit—it's better than the wall that was projected."

Presidency

Fact-checking Trump
Trump's statements as president have engaged a host of fact-checkers. Tony Burman wrote: "The falsehoods and distortions uttered by Trump and his senior officials have particularly inflamed journalists and have been challenged—resulting in a growing prominence of 'fact-checkers' and investigative reporting." The situation got worse over time, as described by Pulitzer Prize-winning journalist Ashley Parker: "President Trump seems to be saying more and more things that aren't true."

Glenn Kessler said in 2017 that in his job as a fact-checker for The Washington Post there was no comparison between Trump and other politicians. Kessler gave his worst rating to other politicians 15 percent to 20 percent of the time, but gave it to Trump 63 percent to 65 percent of the time. Kessler wrote that Trump was the most fact-challenged politician that he had ever encountered and lamented that "the pace and volume of the president's misstatements means that we cannot possibly keep up". Kessler and others have described how Trump's lying has created an alternate/alternative reality. David Zurawik says we should "just assume Trump's always lying and fact check him backwards" because that's "how to cover a habitual liar".

The Washington Post fact-checker created a new category of falsehoods in December 2018, the "Bottomless Pinocchio," for falsehoods repeated at least twenty times (so often "that there can be no question the politician is aware his or her facts are wrong"). Trump was the only politician who met the standard of the category, with 14 statements that immediately qualified. According to The Washington Post, Trump repeated some falsehoods so many times he had effectively engaged in disinformation.

Glenn Kessler wrote:

Professor Robert Prentice summarized the views of many fact-checkers:

At the end of 2018, Kessler provided a run-down summary of Trump's accelerating rate of false statements during the year:

Several major fact-checking sites regularly fact-checked Trump, including:
 PolitiFact, which awarded Trump its "Lie of the Year" in 2015, 2017 and 2019.
 FactCheck.org, which dubbed Trump the "King of Whoppers" in 2015.
 The Washington Post said in January 2020 that Trump had made more than 16,241 false or misleading claims as president, an average of about 14.8 such statements per day.
 The Toronto Star which said that, as of June 2019, Trump had made 5,276 false statements since his inauguration.

As late as June 2018, the news media were debating whether to use the word "lie" to describe Trump's falsehoods. That month, however, many news organizations, including CNN, Star Tribune, Financial Times, Los Angeles Times, Chicago Tribune, The New Yorker, and Foreign Policy began describing some of Trump's false statements as lies. The Toronto Star was one of the first outlets to use the word "lie" to describe Trump's statements, and continues to do so frequently. Still, some organizations have continued to shy away from the term.

On June 5, 2019, Paul Farhi wrote that Glenn Kessler, author of The Washington Post "Fact Checker" column, had used the word lie only once to describe Trump's statements, although he has sometimes used other terminology that implies lying. Since then, The Washington Posts fact-checking team has written the 2020 book Donald Trump and His Assault on Truth. The President's Falsehoods, Misleading Claims and Flat-Out Lies.

By October 9, 2019, The Washington Posts fact-checking team documented that Trump had "made 13,435 false or misleading claims over 993 days". On October 18, 2019, the Washington Post Fact Checker newsletter described the situation:

After departing the White House on the final day of his presidency, January 20, 2021, Trump gave a farewell address at Joint Base Andrews in Maryland prior to departing on Air Force One for his residence in Palm Beach, Florida. The AP fact-checked his speech, and reported that it included a number of false statements about his presidency and his administration's accomplishments. These included the statements that he passed the largest tax cuts in history; that the U.S. economy during his tenure was the greatest in U.S. history; that he achieved record job creation; that his administration rebuilt both the U.S. military and the American manufacturing industry; that he destroyed the ISIS caliphate; and a reiteration of his previously repeated falsehood that he, and not former President Barack Obama, had passed the Veterans Choice Act. These falsehoods added to the 30,573 falsehoods that The Washington Posts fact-checker had tallied by the end of Trump's presidency, an average of 21 falsehoods a day.

Credibility polling
According to a September 2018 CNN-SSRS poll of 1,003 respondents, only 32% percent found Trump honest and trustworthy, the worst read in CNN polling history. The number was 33% on election day, November 8, 2016. In June 2020, a Gallup poll of 1,034 adults within the U.S. found that 36% found Trump honest and trustworthy. By comparison, 60% of respondents found President Obama honest and trustworthy in June 2012 during his re-election campaign.

Commentary and analysis
As president, Trump frequently made false statements in public speeches and remarks. Trump uttered "at least one false or misleading claim per day on 91 of his first 99 days" in office according to The New York Times, and 1,318 total in his first 263 days in office according to the "Fact Checker" political analysis column of The Washington Post. By the Posts tally, it took Trump 601 days to reach 5,000 false or misleading statements and another 226 days to reach the 10,000 mark. For the seven weeks leading up to the midterm elections, it rose to an average of 30 per day from 4.9 during his first 100 days in office. The Post found that Trump averaged 15 false statements per day during 2018.

The New York Times editorial board frequently lambasted Trump's dishonesty. In September 2018, the board called him "a president with no clear relation to the truth". The following month, the board published an opinion piece titled, "Donald Trump Is Lyin' Up a Storm".

James Comey had frequent discussions with Trump, and in his first major interview after his firing he described Trump as a serial liar who tells "baffling, unnecessary" falsehoods:

The Washington Post commentator Greg Sargent pointed out eight instances where government officials either repeated falsehoods or came up with misleading information to support falsehoods asserted by Trump, including various false claims about terrorists crossing or attempting to cross the Mexican border, that a 10% middle class tax cut had been passed, and a doctored video justifying Jim Acosta's removal from the White House press room.

James P. Pfiffner, writing for The Evolving American Presidency book series, wrote that compared to previous presidents, Trump tells "vastly" more "conventional lies" that politicians usually tell to avoid criticism or improve their image. However, Pfiffner emphasized that "the most significant" lies told by Trump are instead "egregious false statements that are demonstrably contrary to well-known facts," because by causing disagreements about what the facts are, then people cannot properly evaluate their government: "Political power rather than rational discourse then becomes the arbiter."

Selman Özdan, writing in the journal Postdigital Science and Education, describes that "many" of Trump's statements in interviews or on Twitter "may now be classed as bullshit," with their utter disregard for the truth, and their focus on telling "a version of reality that suits Trump's aims". She added that these statements are "often" written in a way which criticizes or mocks others, while offering a misleading version of Trump's accomplishments to improve his image.

Daniel Dale, writing for The Washington Post, described fact-checking Trump as being "like fact-checking one of those talking dolls programmed to say the same phrases for eternity, except if none of those phrases were true", noting that Trump had repeatedly and falsely claimed that he had passed the Veterans Choice Act and that U.S. Steel was building six, seven, eight or nine plants (the company had invested in two existing plants). Dale added: "Many of Trump's false claims are so transparently wrong that I can fact-check them with a Google search."

Purpose and effect 
A few days after Trump's January 20, 2017, inauguration, some experts expressed serious concerns about how Trump and his staff showed "arrogance" and "lack of respect...for the American people" by making "easily contradicted" false statements that rose to a "new level" above the "general stereotype that politicians lie". They considered the "degree of fabrication" as "simply breathtaking", egregious, and creating an "extraordinarily dangerous situation" for the country.

They elaborated on why they thought Trump and his team were so deceptive: he was using classic gaslighting in a "systematic, sophisticated attempt" as a "political weapon"; he was undermining trust and creating doubt and hatred of the media and all it reports; owning his supporters and implanting "his own version of reality" in their minds; creating confusion so people are vulnerable, don't know what to do, and thus "gain more power over them"; inflating a "sense of his own popularity"; and making people "give up trying to discern the truth".

Specific topics

Inaugural crowd
Trump's presidency began with a series of falsehoods originating from Trump himself. On the day after his inauguration, he falsely accused the media of lying about the size of the inauguration crowd. He then exaggerated the size, and White House press secretary Sean Spicer backed up his claims. When Spicer was accused of intentionally misstating the figures, Kellyanne Conway, in an interview with NBC's Chuck Todd, defended Spicer by saying he merely presented alternative facts. Todd responded by saying, "Alternative facts are not facts; they're falsehoods."

In September 2018, a government photographer admitted that he, at Trump's request, edited pictures of the inauguration to make the crowd appear larger: "The photographer cropped out empty space 'where the crowd ended' for a new set of pictures requested by Trump on the first morning of his presidency, after he was angered by images showing his audience was smaller than Barack Obama's in 2009."

2016 presidential election

Trump went on to claim that his electoral college victory in 2016 was a landslide; that three of the states he did not win in the 2016 election had "serious voter fraud"; and that he didn't win the popular vote because Clinton received 3 million to 5 million illegal votes. Trump made his Trump Tower wiretapping allegations in March 2017, which the Department of Justice twice refuted. In January 2018, Trump claimed that texts between FBI employees Peter Strzok and Lisa Page were tantamount to "treason," but The Wall Street Journal reviewed them and concluded that the texts "show no evidence of a conspiracy against" Trump.

Denial of Russian hacking and election interference 

Trump has frequently denied and/or sowed doubt on the fact that Russian intelligence hacked the DNC and interfered in the 2016 election. He has made many different claims, such as that there was no hacking at all, or that other countries than Russia did it, or that the DNC hacked itself and that Seth Rich was involved. He has said that Russia didn't try to get him elected and often called allegations of Russian meddling "a hoax". "Trump is fond of tossing out conspiracy theories, even if just to add a sliver of doubt. His supporters have embraced his conspiracy theories, especially when it comes to Mueller's investigation." The Russia investigation conclusively proved that Russian intelligence was behind the hackings and interference.

Robert Mueller, who led a Special Counsel investigation, concluded that Russian interference was "sweeping and systematic" and "violated U.S. criminal law", and he indicted twenty-six Russian citizens and three Russian organizations. The investigation also led to indictments and convictions of Trump campaign officials and associated Americans, on unrelated charges. The Special Counsel's report, made public in April 2019, examined numerous contacts between the Trump campaign and Russian officials but concluded that, though the Trump campaign welcomed the Russian activities and expected to benefit from them, there was insufficient evidence to bring any conspiracy or coordination charges against Trump or his associates.Russian government interfered in the election in "sweeping and systematic fashion" and violated U.S. criminal laws.

Dismissal of FBI director
On May 9, 2017, Trump dismissed James Comey, the director of the Federal Bureau of Investigation, saying he had accepted the recommendations of U.S. attorney general Jeff Sessions and deputy attorney general Rod Rosenstein to dismiss Comey. In their respective letters, neither Trump, Sessions nor Rosenstein mentioned the issue of an FBI investigation into links between Trump associates and Russian officials, with Rosenstein writing that Comey should be dismissed for his handling of the conclusion of the FBI investigation into the Hillary Clinton email controversy, a rationale seconded by Sessions. On May 11, Trump said in an NBC News interview: "Regardless of recommendation, I was going to fire Comey... in fact, when I decided to just do it, I said to myself, I said, you know, this Russia thing with Trump and Russia is a made-up story". On May 31, Trump wrote on Twitter, "I never fired James Comey because of Russia!"

Personal lawyer
In 2017 and in the first half of 2018, Trump repeatedly praised his personal attorney Michael Cohen as "a great lawyer," "a loyal, wonderful person," "a good man" and someone Trump "always liked" and "respected". In the second half of 2018, with Cohen testifying to federal investigations, Trump attacked Cohen as a "rat," "a weak person, and not a very smart person" and described Cohen as "a PR person who did small legal work, very small legal work... He represented me very little".

In 2018, Trump told reporters on Air Force One that he did not know about a payment of $130,000 that Cohen made to porn actress Stormy Daniels or where Cohen had obtained the money from. Glenn Kessler of The Washington Post described this statement as a lie, as Trump had personally reimbursed Cohen for the payment.

In 2021, several lawyers who had previously worked with Trump reportedly declined to assist him in asserting executive privilege over the subpoenas served by the House Select Committee on January 6. One of these lawyers was William Burck, who had once represented 11 Trump associates regarding the Mueller investigation. When Trump was asked about the refusal of his former lawyers to involve themselves in his current legal battle, he said: "I don't even know who they are... I am using lawyers who have been with us from the beginning."

Spygate conspiracy theory
In May 2018, Trump developed and promoted the false Spygate conspiracy theory alleging that the Obama administration planted a spy inside Trump's campaign to help Hillary Clinton win the 2016 election.

Political commentators and high-ranking politicians from both sides of the political spectrum have dismissed Trump's allegations as lacking evidence and maintained that the FBI's use of Halper as a covert informant was in no way improper. Trump's claims about when the counterintelligence investigation was initiated have been shown to be false. A December 2019 Justice Department Inspector General report "found no evidence that the FBI attempted to place any [Confidential Human Sources] within the Trump campaign, recruit members of the Trump campaign as CHSs, or task CHSs to report on the Trump campaign."

2018 California wildfires

During the 2018 California wildfires which ultimately caused $3.5 billion in damages and killed 103 people, Trump misrepresented a method that Finland uses to control wildfires. After speaking with President of Finland Sauli Niinistö, Trump reported on November 17, 2018, that Niinistö had called Finland a "forest nation" and that "they spend a lot of time on raking and cleaning and doing things, and they don't have any problem." Trump's comments sparked online memes about raking leaves. President Niinistö later clarified that there is "a good surveillance system and network" for forest management in Finland and that he did not recall having mentioned raking.

Special counsel investigation
In March 2019, Trump asserted that the special counsel investigation was "illegal". Previously in June 2018, Trump argued that "the appointment of the Special Counsel is totally UNCONSTITUTIONAL!" However, in August 2018, Dabney Friedrich, a Trump-appointed judge on the DC District Court ruled the appointment was constitutional, as did a unanimous three-judge panel of the Court of Appeals for the DC Circuit in February 2019.

The Mueller Report asserted that Trump's family members, campaign staff, Republican backers, administration officials, and his associates lied or made false assertions, with the plurality of falsehoods from Trump himself (mostly while he was president), whether unintentional or not, to the public, Congress, or authorities, per a CNN analysis.

Also in March 2019, following the release of Attorney General William Barr's summary of the findings of the completed special counsel investigation, Trump tweeted: "No Collusion, No Obstruction, Complete and Total EXONERATION". However, Barr had quoted special counsel Mueller as writing that "while this report does not conclude that the President committed a crime, it also does not exonerate him" on whether he had committed obstruction of justice. Barr declined to bring an obstruction-of-justice charge against the President. In testimony to Congress in May 2019, Barr said he "didn't exonerate" Trump on obstruction as that was not the role of the Justice Department.

Economy

Through his first 28 months in office, Trump repeatedly and falsely characterized the economy during his presidency as the best in American history.

As of March 2019, Trump's most repeated falsehoods, each repeated during his presidency more than a hundred times, were that a U.S. trade deficit would be a "loss" for the country, that his tax cuts were the largest in American history, that the economy was the strongest ever during his administration, and that the wall was already being built. By August, he had made this last claim at least 190 times. He also made 100 false claims about NATO spending, whether on the part of the U.S. or other NATO members.

Trump claimed during the campaign that the U.S. real GDP could grow at rate of "5 or even 6" percent under his policies. During 2018, the economy grew at 2.9%, the same rate as 2015 under President Obama. Longer-term projections beyond 2019 by the CBO and Federal Reserve are for growth below 2%. President Obama's advisers explained growth limits as "sluggish worker productivity and shrinking labor supply as baby boomers retire".

Trump claimed in October 2017 he would eliminate the federal debt over eight years, even though it was $19 trillion at the time. However, the annual deficit (debt addition) in 2018 was nearly $800 billion, about 60% higher than the CBO forecast of $500 billion when Trump took office. The CBO January 2019 forecast for the 2018–2027 debt addition is now 40% higher, at $13.0 trillion rather than $9.4 trillion when Trump was inaugurated. Other forecasts place the debt addition over a decade at $16 trillion, bringing the total to around $35 trillion. Rather than a debt to GDP ratio in 2028 of 89% had Obama's policies continued, CBO now estimates this figure at 107%, assuming Trump's tax cuts for individuals are extended past 2025.

Trump sought to present his economic policies as successful in encouraging businesses to invest in new facilities and create jobs. In this effort, he took credit on several occasions for business investments that began before he became president.

Trump repeatedly claimed that China or Chinese exporters were bearing the burden of his tariffs, not Americans, a claim PolitiFact rated as "false". Studies indicate U.S. consumers and purchasers of imports are bearing the cost and that tariffs are essentially a regressive tax. For example, CBO reported in January 2020 that: "Tariffs are expected to reduce the level of [U.S.] real GDP by roughly 0.5 percent and raise consumer prices by 0.5 percent in 2020. As a result, tariffs are also projected to reduce average real household income by $1,277 (in 2019 dollars) in 2020." While Trump has argued that tariffs would reduce the trade deficit, it expanded to a record dollar level in 2018.

Trump repeatedly claimed that the U.S. had a $500 billion annual trade deficit with China before his presidency; the actual deficit never reached $400 billion prior to his presidency.

The following table illustrates some of the key economic variables in the last three years of the Obama Administration (2014–2016) and the first three years of the Trump Administration (2017–2019). Trump often claimed the economy was doing better than it was when he was elected.

Family separation policy

President Trump repeatedly and falsely said he inherited his administration's family separation policy from Obama, his predecessor. In November 2018, Trump said, "President Obama separated children from families, and all I did was take the same law, and then I softened the law." In April 2019, Trump said, "President Obama separated children. They had child separation; I was the one that changed it." In June 2019, Trump said, "President Obama had a separation policy. I didn't have it. He had it. I brought the families together. I'm the one that put them together... I inherited separation, and I changed the plan". Trump's assertion was false because the Obama administration had no policy systematically separating migrant families, while "zero tolerance" was not instituted until April 2018. PolitiFact quoted immigration experts saying that under the Obama administration families were detained and released together and separations rarely happened.

E. Jean Carroll sexual-assault accusation

In June 2019, writer E. Jean Carroll accused Trump of raping her in a department store in the mid-1990s. In an official statement, Trump said that (1) he had "never met [Carroll] in my life" although she provided a photograph of them socializing in 1987, and (2) the store shared security footage debunking the claim though in his 2022 deposition for the case, he denied having reached out to the company. Trump was also criticized for saying in 2019 that Carroll was "not [his] type" but in his deposition confusing her in the aforementioned photograph for his  Marla Maples.

Article II and unlimited executive power
In July 2019, during a speech addressing youth at Turning Point USA Teen Student Action Summit in Washington, The Washington Post reported that, while criticizing the Mueller investigation, Trump falsely claimed Article Two of the U.S. Constitution ensures, "I have the right to do whatever I want as president." The Post clarified that "Article II grants the president 'executive power'. It does not indicate the president has total power".

Hurricane Dorian

As Hurricane Dorian approached the Atlantic coast in late August 2019, Trump presented himself as closely monitoring the situation, tweeting extensively about it as The New York Times reported he was "assuming the role of meteorologist in chief". On September 1, Trump tweeted that Alabama, among other states, "will most likely be hit (much) harder than anticipated" by Dorian. By that time, no weather forecaster was predicting Dorian would impact Alabama and the eight National Hurricane Center forecast updates over the preceding 24 hours showed Dorian steering well away from Alabama and moving up the Atlantic coast. The Birmingham, Alabama office of the National Weather Service (NWS) contradicted Trump 20 minutes later, tweeting that Alabama "will NOT see any impacts from Dorian." After ABC News White House reporter Jonathan Karl reported the correction, Trump tweeted it was "Such a phony hurricane report by lightweight reporter
@jonkarl".

On September 4, in the Oval Office, Trump displayed a modified version of an August 29 diagram by the National Hurricane Center of the projected track of Dorian. The modification was done with a black marker and extended the cone of uncertainty of the hurricane's possible path into southern Alabama. Modifying official government weather forecasts is illegal in the U.S. A White House official later told The Washington Post Trump had altered the diagram with a Sharpie marker. Trump said he did not know how the map came to be modified and defended his claims, saying he had "a better map" with models that "in all cases [showed] Alabama was hit". Later on September 4, Trump tweeted a map by the South Florida Water Management District dated August 28 showing numerous projected paths of Dorian; Trump falsely asserted "almost all models" showed Dorian approaching Alabama. A note on the map stated it was "superseded" by National Hurricane Center publications and that it was to be discarded if there were any discrepancies.

On September 5, after Fox News correspondent John Roberts reported about the story live from the White House, Trump summoned him to the Oval Office. Roberts later characterized Trump as "just looking for acknowledgment that he was not wrong for saying that at some point, Alabama was at risk—even if the situation had changed by the time he issued the tweet". Later that day, Trump's Homeland Security Advisor Peter Brown issued a statement asserting Trump had been provided a graphic on September 1 showing tropical storm force winds touching the southeastern corner of Alabama; a White House source told CNN that Trump had personally instructed Brown to issue the statement.

On September 6, at Trump's direction, acting White House chief of staff Mick Mulvaney told Commerce secretary Wilbur Ross to order acting NOAA administrator Neil Jacobs to fix the contradiction by Birmingham NWS, and Ross threatened to fire top NOAA officials if he did not. NOAA then tweeted a statement by an unnamed spokesman disavowing the Birmingham NWS tweet, asserting "the information provided by NOAA and the National Hurricane Center to President Trump and the wider public demonstrated that tropical-storm-force winds from Hurricane Dorian could impact Alabama," adding that the Birmingham tweet "spoke in absolute terms that were inconsistent with probabilities from the best forecast products available at the time". The president of the NWS Employees Organization responded, "the hard-working employees of the NWS had nothing to do with the utterly disgusting and disingenuous tweet sent out by NOAA management tonight". Former senior NOAA executives were also sharply critical. That evening, Trump tweeted a video of a CNN hurricane forecast from the Wednesday before his Sunday tweet in which the forecaster mentioned Alabama could be affected by Dorian—with the video altered to show "Alabama" being repeated several times; the video ended with a CNN logo careening off a road and bursting into flames. Trump continued to insist he was correct through September 7, asserting "The Fake News Media was fixated" on the matter and tweeting forecast maps from at least two days before his original Sunday tweet, as the media dubbed the episode "Sharpiegate". Numerous commentators expressed bafflement that Trump chose to continue insisting he was correct about what might otherwise have passed as a relatively minor gaffe.

On September 9, NWS director Louis Uccellini said the Birmingham NWS had not tweeted in response to Trump's tweet, but rather in response to numerous phone calls and social media contacts their office had received in response to Trump's tweet. "Only later, when the retweets and politically based comments started coming to their office, did they learn the sources of this information," he said.

Meeting with Iran
On September 16, 2019, Trump tweeted that "the fake news" was incorrectly reporting that he was willing to meet with Iran with no pre-conditions. Trump had said in July 2018 and June 2019 that he was willing to meet with Iran with no pre-conditions, and secretary of state Mike Pompeo and treasury secretary Steven Mnuchin confirmed this to be Trump's position during a White House press briefing five days before Trump's tweet.

Obamagate conspiracy theory

Trump and some of his supporters allege that Obama and his administration conspired to politically surveil Trump's presidential campaign and presidential transition through inappropriate investigations by the Department of Justice, the U.S. Intelligence Community, and the U.S. Foreign Intelligence Surveillance Court. Trump nicknamed the series of events, which he called a major scandal, Obamagate. Trump's critics called it an unfounded conspiracy theory.

On May 10, 2020—one day after former president Barack Obama criticized the Trump administration's handling of the COVID-19 pandemic—Trump posted a one-word tweet: "OBAMAGATE!" On May 11, Philip Rucker of The Washington Post asked Trump what crime former president Barack Obama committed. Trump's reply was: "Obamagate. It's been going on for a long time ... from before I even got elected and it's a disgrace that it happened.... Some terrible things happened and it should never be allowed to happen in our country again." When Rucker again asked what the crime was, Trump said: "You know what the crime is. The crime is very obvious to everybody. All you have to do is read the newspapers, except yours." On May 15, Trump tweeted that Obamagate was the "greatest political scandal in the history of the United States". This was the third time Trump claimed to be suffering from a scandal of such magnitude, after previously giving Spygate and the Russia investigation similar labels. Also on May 15, Trump linked Obamagate to the "persecution" of Michael Flynn, and a missing 302 form.

Trump called for Congress to summon Obama to testify about "the biggest political crime". Senator Lindsey Graham, chair of the Senate Judiciary Committee, said that he did not expect to summon Obama, but would summon other Obama administration officials. Meanwhile, Attorney General William Barr stated that he did not "expect" Obama to be investigated of a crime. Some of Trump's allies have suggested that the "crime" involved the FBI launching an investigation into incoming national security advisor Michael Flynn, or possibly the "unmasking" by outgoing Obama officials to find out the name of a person who was reported in intelligence briefings to be conversing with the Russian ambassador.

In a May 2020 op-ed at the news website RealClearPolitics, Charles Lipson, professor emeritus of political science at the University of Chicago analyzed the content of "Obamagate". He claimed that the concept refers to three intertwined scandals: (1) The Obama administration conducted mass surveillance through the NSA; (2) the Obama administration used surveillance against Trump's 2016 presidential campaign, and (3) the Obama administration did not transfer power seamlessly to the new Trump administration. Lipson further claimed that "these abuses didn't simply follow each other; their targets, goals, and principal players overlapped. Taken together, they represent some of the gravest violations of constitutional norms and legal protections in American history".

The AP in May 2020 addressed Obamagate in a fact check, stating that there was "no evidence" of Trump's suggestion that "the disclosure of Flynn's name as part of legal U.S. surveillance of foreign targets was criminal and motivated by partisan politics." AP stated that there is not only "nothing illegal about unmasking," but also that the unmasking of Flynn was approved using the National Security Agency's "standard process." Unmasking is allowed if officials feel that it is needed to understand the collected intelligence. AP further pointed out that the Trump administration was conducting even more unmasking than the Obama administration in the final year of Obama's presidency. In May 2020, attorney general Bill Barr appointed federal prosecutor John Bash to examine unmasking conducted by the Obama administration. The inquiry concluded in October with no findings of substantive wrongdoing. By October 2020, the complex "Obamagate" narrative served as an evolution and rebranding of the "Spygate" conspiracy.

Joe Scarborough murder conspiracy theory
Trump repeatedly advocated a baseless conspiracy theory suggesting that television host Joe Scarborough was involved in the 2001 death of a staffer who worked for Scarborough while the latter was a member of Congress. Trump labeled the woman's death an unsolved "cold case" in one of multiple tweets and called on his followers to continue to "keep digging" and to "use forensic geniuses" to find out more about the death. Scarborough's wife and Morning Joe co-host Mika Brzezinski called the president a "cruel, sick, disgusting person" for his tweets and urged Twitter to remove Trump's tweets. Scarborough called Trump's tweet "unspeakably cruel".

Lori Klausutis was a constituent services coordinator in one of Scarborough's congressional offices in Fort Walton Beach, Florida. Klausutis was found dead on the floor near her desk in that office on July 19, 2001. An autopsy by Medical Examiner Dr. Michael Berkland revealed a previously undiagnosed heart-valve irregularity, floppy mitral valve disease, that caused a cardiac arrhythmia that in turn halted her heart, stopped her breathing, and caused the 28-year-old to lose consciousness, fall, and hit her head on the edge of a desk. Klausutis' cause of death was determined at the time of death to be due to natural causes, and local authorities have never attempted to re-investigate because there was no evidence of an alternative explanation for her death. Scarborough was in Washington, D.C. at the time of her death in Florida.

In May 2020, Klausutis's widower, Timothy Klausutis, called for the removal of Trump's tweets. He wrote a letter to Jack Dorsey, the CEO of Twitter, saying: "I'm asking you to intervene in this instance because the President of the United States has taken something that does not belong to him—the memory of my dead wife—and perverted it for perceived political gain". Twitter refused to take down Trump's false tweets, and the White House Press Secretary, Kayleigh McEnany, only stated that her heart was with the family. Twitter stated that statements by the President, even false ones, are newsworthy.

Advances for black Americans
In 2020, Trump claimed multiple times that he or his administration had "done more for the black community than any president," in some cases compared to all presidents, and in other cases to all presidents "since Abraham Lincoln" (who abolished slavery in the U.S.). Prominent historians instead pointed to Lyndon B. Johnson as the president who did most for the black community since Lincoln, for his Civil Rights Act of 1964 and his Voting Rights Act of 1965. The historians also highlighted that the presidencies of Harry Truman, Ulysses S. Grant, Franklin D. Roosevelt, John F. Kennedy, and Barack Obama had done much for the black community. Trump's own achievements were dismissed as minor, while Trump was faulted for racially divisive rhetoric and attacks on voting rights.

Republican Party approval rating tweets

After Trump took office in 2017, he routinely tweeted an approval rating between 94% and 98% in the Republican Party without citing a source. Trump tweeted these approval ratings almost weekly, with a percentage around 96%. For example, a tweet from June 16, 2020, by Trump says "96% Approval Rating in the Republican Party. Thank you!" Another tweet from August 23, 2019, says "94% Approval Rating within the  Republican Party. Thank you!" Trump's approval rating in the Republican Party was found to be around 88% in a Fox News poll, 90% in a Gallup poll and 79% in an AP-NORC poll but there is no evidence to support his tweets of the approval ratings around 96%.

The Pew Research Center has reported an average approval rating of 87% amongst Republicans.

Ilhan Omar 
In 2019, Trump falsely accused Ilhan Omar of praising al-Qaeda, describing remarks Omar made in 2013 about how one of her college professors acted when he discussed al-Qaeda. In 2021, Trump stated without evidence that Omar married her brother, committed "large-scale immigration and election fraud", and wished "death to Israel".

COVID-19 pandemic

Trump denied responsibility for his administration's disbanding of the US Pandemic Response Team headed by Rear Adm. R. Timothy Ziemer in 2018.

Trump made various false, misleading, or inaccurate statements related to the COVID-19 pandemic, such as "We have it under control. It's going to be just fine" (January 22, 2020); "Looks like by April, you know, in theory, when it gets a little warmer, it miraculously goes away" (February 10), and "Anybody that wants a test can get a test" (March 6). Trump also repeatedly claimed that the pandemic would "go away", even as the number of daily new cases rose.

On February 24, Trump tweeted: "The Coronavirus is very much under control in the USA," and the next day Trump said, "I think that whole situation will start working out. We're very close to a vaccine," when none was known to be near production.

In late February, the Trump Administration stated that the outbreak containment was "close to airtight" and that the virus is only as deadly as the seasonal flu. Including that, the administration also stated that the outbreak was "contained" in early March even as the number of U.S. cases continued to increase, regardless of being publicly challenged.

While on Fox News, Trump contradicted the World Health Organization (WHO) estimate that the global mortality rate for SARS-CoV-2 coronavirus is 3.4%, saying. "Well, I think the 3.4 percent is really a false number—and this is just my hunch—but based on a lot of conversations with a lot of people that do this, because a lot of people will have this and it's very mild, they'll get better very rapidly. They don't even see a doctor. They don't even call a doctor. You never hear about those people," and said his "hunch" is that the real figure is "way under 1%". Trump also speculated that "thousands or hundreds of thousands" of people might have recovered "by, you know, sitting around and even going to work—some of them go to work but they get better," contradicting medical advice to slow disease transmission. On March 17, Trump stated, "I felt it was a pandemic long before it was called a pandemic."

Anthony Fauci, director of National Institute of Allergy and Infectious Diseases, explained in a Science interview that before COVID-19 press conferences, the task force presents its consensus to Trump "and somebody writes a speech. Then (Trump) gets up and ad libs on his speech". Fauci explained that afterwards, the task force told him to "be careful about this and don't say that," adding "I can't jump in front of the microphone and push him down. OK, he said it. Let's try and get it corrected for the next time."

Trump made 33 false claims about the coronavirus crisis in the first two weeks of March, per a CNN analysis. Trump  made various other incorrect COVID-19 related statements. One false claim was that the U.S. had the highest rate per capita of COVID-19 testing, which it did not at the time, compared to South Korea, Italy, and Germany. Trump's misrepresentations often attempt to paint the federal coronavirus response in an excessively positive light, such as claiming that hospitals "even in the really hot spots" were "really thrilled" with the level of medical supplies, when in fact hospitals nationwide were concerned about shortages of medications, personal protective equipment, and ventilators.

An NBC News/Wall Street Journal poll conducted from April 13–15, 900 registered voters, found that 36% of Americans trusted Trump for information on COVID-19, and 52% distrusted him for that information.

On April 14, Trump said that he had "total" authority to reopen states, then said the next day that state governors had to make their own decision on when to reopen.

On April 16, Trump said "Our experts say the curve has flattened, and the peak in new cases is behind us." Trump added that "Nationwide, more than 850 counties, or nearly 30 percent of our country, have reported no new cases in the last seven days." The 30 percent of the counties in the country represented 6 percent of the population. Cases were added in counties where 94 percent of the population lived.

On April 28, while discussing his own response to the pandemic, Trump falsely suggested that in late February, Dr. Anthony Fauci had said that the American COVID-19 outbreak was "no problem" and was "going to blow over". Contrary to Trump's claims, Fauci had said in a February 29 interview that "now the risk is still low, but this could change ... You've got to watch out because although the risk is low now ... when you start to see community spread, this could change and force you to become much more attentive to doing things that would protect you from spread ... this could be a major outbreak." Also on February 29, Fauci had stressed during a press conference that "we want to underscore that this is an evolving situation".

On May 19, Trump tweeted a statement claiming that the WHO had consistently ignored credible reports of the virus spreading in Wuhan in December 2019, including reports from The Lancet. The Lancet rejected Trump's claims, saying "The Lancet published no report in December, 2019, referring to a virus or outbreak in Wuhan or anywhere else in China. The first reports the journal published were on January 24, 2020". The Lancet also wrote that the allegations that Trump made against the WHO were "serious and damaging to efforts to strengthen international cooperation to control this pandemic". The Lancet also said that "It is essential that any review of the global response is based on a factually accurate account of what took place in December and January".

On June 20, at a rally in Tulsa, Oklahoma, Trump suggested that America should slow down testing. In response to the high number of tests, he said that "When you do testing to that extent, you're going to find more people, you're going to find more cases, so I said to my people, 'Slow the testing down, please.'" White House officials claimed that Trump was only joking. In an interview, Trump said that while he never gave an order to slow down testing, he claimed that if the U.S. slowed down the testing, they would look like they're doing better. "I wouldn't do that," he said, "but I will say this: We do so much more than other countries it makes us, in a way, look bad but actually we're doing the right thing." At the time, the percentage of positive cases in the U.S. was over two times higher than recommended by the WHO.

On July 4, 2020, Trump falsely stated that "99 percent" of COVID-19 cases are "totally harmless". In the same speech, Trump contradicted several public health experts by saying that the U.S. will "likely have a therapeutic and/or vaccine solution long before the end of the year". FDA commissioner Stephen Hahn declined to state whether Trump's "99 percent" statement was accurate or to say how many cases are harmless. In March, the WHO estimated 15% of COVID-19 cases become severe and 5% become critical.

As the U.S. COVID-19 daily new case count increased from about 20,000 on June 9 to over 50,000 by July 7, Trump repeatedly insisted that the case increase was a function of increased COVID-19 testing. Trump's claims were contradicted by the facts that states having increased case counts as well as those having decreased case counts had increased testing, that the positive test rate increased in all ten states with the largest case increases, and that case rate increases consistently exceeded testing rate increases in states with the most new cases.

On August 5, 2020, Trump asserted that children should go back to school and learn in an in-person setting. He said, "If you look at children, children are almost, I would almost say definitely, but almost immune from this disease. So few. Hard to believe. I don't know how you feel about it but they have much stronger immune systems than we do somehow for this. They don't have a problem." According to the U.S. Centers for Disease Control and Prevention, children account for about 7.3% of COVID-19 cases. A study reported in Science Magazine showed that "children under age 14 are between one-third and one-half as likely as adults to contract the virus." Facebook took action against President Trump's claim that children are "almost immune," removing a video of him making this claim that was posted on his official Facebook account. Twitter took action against a similar tweet made by Trump's campaign, stating that the account would be restricted from tweeting until the tweet was removed. The Trump campaign account removed the tweet later that day.

Trump noted New Zealand's success in dealing with COVID-19 while referring on August 18, 2020, to a "big surge in New Zealand"—on a day when New Zealand had 13 new reported cases of infection, a cumulative total of 1,643 COVID-19 cases and a cumulative total of 22 COVID-19-related deaths, with no new COVID-19-related deaths reported since late May 2020. Local commentators in New Zealand called Trump's terminology into question—Deputy Prime Minister Winston Peters noted: "The American people can work out that what we have for a whole day, they have every 22 seconds of the day [...]."
(New Zealand has a total population about 1.5 percent of that of the U.S.)

In a series of eighteen interviews from December 5, 2019, to July 21, 2020, between Donald Trump and Bob Woodward, Trump admitted that he deceived the public about the severity of the COVID-19 pandemic. On February 7, he told Woodward, "This is deadly stuff. You just breathe the air and that's how it's passed. And so that's a very tricky one. That's a very delicate one. It's also more deadly than even your strenuous flu." On March 19, he said in another interview, "I wanted to always play it down. I still like playing it down, because I don't want to create a panic." Many audio recordings of these interviews were released on September 9, 2020.

The military and veterans
In 2014, a bipartisan initiative for veterans' healthcare, led by Senators Bernie Sanders and John McCain, was signed into law by President Barack Obama. The Veterans Choice program enables eligible veterans to receive government funding for healthcare provided outside the VA system. In 2018, Trump signed the VA MISSION Act to expand the eligibility criteria. Over the next two years, Trump falsely claimed over 150 times that he had created the Veterans Choice program itself. When reporter Paula Reid questioned him about this in August 2020, noting that he repeatedly made a "false statement" in taking credit for the program, Trump abruptly walked out of the news conference.

In a speech given at Al Asad Airbase to US military personnel on Christmas 2018, Trump boasted that the military had not gotten a raise in ten years, and that he would be giving them a raise of over 10 percent. In fact, American military personnel received a pay hike of at least one percent for the past 30 years, got a 2.4 percent pay increase in 2018, and would receive a 2.6 percent pay increase for 2019.

On January 3, 2020, Trump stated in a speech "Last night, at my direction, the United States military successfully executed a flawless precision strike that killed the number-one terrorist anywhere in the world, Qasem Soleimani." Trump's act of changing the reasons for killing Soleimani were questioned and analyzed by fact-checkers, and Secretary of Defense Mark Esper contradicted Trump's claim that the Iranians were planning to attack four embassies.

Voting by mail

President Trump repeatedly made false, misleading or baseless claims in his criticism of voting by mail in the U.S. This included claims that other countries would print "millions of mail-in ballots", claims that "80 million unsolicited ballots" were being sent to Americans, and claims that Nevada's presidential election process was "100% rigged". Another claim was alleging massive voter fraud. In September 2020, FBI Director Christopher A. Wray, who was appointed by Trump, testified under oath that the FBI had "not seen, historically, any kind of coordinated national voter fraud effort in a major election, whether it's by mail or otherwise".

2020 presidential election

During his 2020 presidential campaign, Trump claimed his opponent Joe Biden would "destroy" Americans' "protections for pre-existing conditions", while Trump's administration has said the entire Affordable Care Act, which created such protections, should be struck down.

On November 4, Trump delivered a speech inside the White House falsely claiming he had already won the 2020 presidential election. He made numerous false and misleading statements to support his belief that vote counting should stop and that he should be confirmed as the winner. After Joe Biden was declared the winner of the election, Trump repeatedly and falsely claimed Biden had won through ballot fraud against him. He repeated and tweeted false and misleading claims about vote counting, Dominion Voting Systems, poll watchers, alleged voting irregularities, and more. During the two-month transition period to the Biden administration, according to a Huffington Post count of his false claims, Trump said the election was rigged (he made this claim 68 times), stolen (35 times), determined by fraudulent or miscounted votes (250 times), and affected by malfunctioning voting machines (45 times).

Following the election, Trump continued to claim he had won it and that it was a rigged election. Anthony Scaramucci, a longtime Trump associate who was briefly White House communications director before breaking with Trump, said in July 2022 that the former president knew the election had not been stolen. Scaramucci said that during the 2016 campaign Trump had asked him and others why people didn't realize he was playacting and 'full of it' at least half the time, "so he knows that this is all a lie." Nearly two years after the election, Trump persisted in the false claim. For example, on August 29, 2022, he demanded on Truth Social that the nation "declare the rightful winner or ... have a new Election, immediately!”

In October 2022, a U.S. District Court Judge ruled that Trump and allies participated in a "knowing misrepresentation of voter fraud numbers in Georgia when seeking to overturn the election results in federal court". Specifically, the judge wrote that "President Trump knew that the specific numbers of voter fraud were wrong but continued to tout those numbers, both in court and to the public". The judge also found that related emails "are sufficiently related to and in furtherance of a conspiracy to defraud the United States" that the crime-fraud exemption voids Trump's lawyer's claim of attorney–client privilege.

January 6 attack

During the January 6, 2021, attack, minutes after Mike Pence had been rushed off the Senate floor, Trump tweeted that "Mike Pence didn't have the courage" to refuse to certify the election results, implying Pence had the Constitutional power to do so—a claim dismissed by the federal judges in the final two of 62 election-related lawsuits.

In a January 7, 2021, White House video, Trump claimed, falsely, that he had "immediately deployed the National Guard and federal law enforcement to secure the building and expel the intruders".

Among outtakes for the January 7 video that were shown on July 21, 2022, by the House Select Committee, Trump remarked, "I don't want to say the election's over. I just want to say Congress has certified the results without saying the election's over, OK?"

In late March 2021, Trump said the rioters "were ushered in by the police" and "They showed up just to show support", which is false in view of the 140 assaults on police officers in hours-long battles involving police engaging in hand-to-hand combat to try to keep rioters out of the building.

At a July 7, 2021, news conference, Trump claimed "the person that shot Ashli Babbitt right through the head, just boom. There was no reason for that"; in fact, Babbitt was shot in the shoulder as she tried to enter an area of the Capitol used to evacuate lawmakers and was within sight of lawmakers being evacuated.

In a July 11, 2021, interview on Fox News, Trump called the events of January 6 a "lovefest" and said that it was "not right" that the rioters were "currently incarcerated"—conflicting with his January 7 statement telling rioters, "You will pay."

In an interview that aired on December 1, 2021, Trump said "hundreds and hundreds of thousands of people" had gathered to hear him speak on the day of the January 6, 2021 attack on the Capitol, saying "I think it was the largest crowd I've ever spoken before"; the Associated Press reported it as "several thousand." Investigators estimated that "more than 2,000 people" entered the Capitol.

On December 10, 2021, Trump told Fox News that the attack was "a protest" and that "the insurrection took place on November 3" (election day), while in fact about 140 police officers were assaulted and the peaceful transfer of power was violently interrupted in an attack that involved thousands of alleged crimes, and the election wasn't rigged or fraudulent. Trump also said to Fox News of his January 6 speech that "if you look at my words and what I said in the speech, they were extremely calming, actually", while in fact his speech proclaimed that "we fight like hell. And if you don't fight like hell, you're not going to have a country anymore."

On December 21, 2021, Trump made a statement calling the attack a "completely unarmed protest". Former White House aide Cassidy Hutchinson subsequently testified before the House January 6 committee that the Secret Service had warned Trump on January 6 that protestors were carrying weapons, but that Trump demanded that the magnetometers—used to detect metallic weapons—be disabled, so that more supporters would fill the rally space. When warned, Trump is said to have angrily responded:

The Department of Justice said that some protestors were armed with guns, stun guns, knives, batons, baseball bats, axes, and chemical sprays. The Department of Justice said in a January 2022 official statement that over 75 people had been charged with entering a restricted area with "a dangerous or deadly weapon".

In a February 5, 2022, rally, Trump said that if he runs again in 2024, "we will treat those people from January 6 fairly... And if it requires pardons, we will give them pardons. Because they are being treated so unfairly"—the claim of unfairness being unsupported by evidence. Trump's claim echoed his September 16, 2021, written statement that "Our hearts and minds are with the people being persecuted so unfairly relating to the January 6th protest concerning the Rigged Presidential Election".

Post-presidency

2021 California gubernatorial recall election 
Before the 2021 California gubernatorial recall election took place, Trump claimed without evidence that the election was "probably rigged" and stated, "Does anybody really believe the California recall election isn't rigged?" After polls closed, he stated there was "rigged voting".

COVID-19 healthcare discrimination against white people 
In reference to a New York policy that allows race to be a consideration when dispensing oral antiviral treatments, Trump distorted this policy during a rally by claiming white people don't get the vaccine and "have to go to the back of the line" for COVID-19 care.

Spygate conspiracy theory 
In a new iteration of the Spygate conspiracy theory, in February 2022, Trump falsely claimed Hillary Clinton spied on him during the Russia investigation.

Drop boxes in the 2020 presidential election in Wisconsin 
Following a Wisconsin Supreme Court ruling declaring ballot drop boxes illegal, Trump claimed this ruling retroactively applies to the 2020 presidential election in Wisconsin. He also suggested he was the legitimate winner of that election.

FBI search of Mar-a-Lago 

Trump has published false, misleading, unsubstantiated, and contradictory claims about the FBI search of Mar-a-Lago. Among his many statements, Trump suggested, without evidence, that President Biden played a role in the search, the FBI planted evidence, the search was unnecessary, and the classified documents in his possession were already declassified. He stated that as a US president, he was not required to follow the prescribed legal process, but could simply declassify them just "by thinking about it", and “because you're sending it, to Mar-a-Lago or wherever you're sending it... it's declassified. I declassified everything.”

Claim of intervening in 2018 Florida vote count 
On November 10, 2022, Trump alleged that Democrats had perpetrated "ballot theft" four years earlier in the Florida gubernatorial election. He claimed that, as President, he had intervened to support Republican candidate Ron DeSantis over his Democratic rival Andrew Gillum. "I sent in the FBI and the U.S. Attorneys," Trump claimed, when it seemed that DeSantis had been "running out of the votes necessary to win.” Trump said he had thereby “fixed” the DeSantis campaign. Gillum filed in court to demand further information from Trump, as it sounded like an admission of wrongdoing; meanwhile, Florida's Broward County elections office denied that any such thing had happened during the 2018 election. The FBI said in March 2023 that it had no records to support Trump's claim.

Campaign for 2024 presidency

Announcement speech
On November 15, 2022, almost two years in advance of the 2024 election, Trump announced his candidacy for a second term as president. His announcement speech at Mar-a-Lago was "full of exaggerated and false talking points" and at least "20 false and misleading claims", uttering the first inaccurate claim "about two minutes in and a few minutes later, tick(ing) off at least four hyperbolic claims about his own accomplishments". The New York Times Fact Check stated that "Mr. Trump repeated many familiar exaggerations about his own achievements, reiterated misleading attacks on political opponents and made dire assessments that were at odds with reality."

Trump's first inaccurate claim, about two minutes in, was that his administration "built the greatest economy in the history of the world", a claim that was inaccurate even for recent American history. Trump wrongly claimed Americans surrendered $85 billion worth of military equipment to the Taliban in the Afghanistan withdrawal; the Defense Department estimate was $7.1 billion, some which was rendered inoperable before the withdrawal. Trump claimed that his administration "filled up" the Strategic Petroleum Reserve but that under Biden it has been "virtually drained"; in fact, the reserve was not "virtually drained" under Biden, and it actually contained less when Trump left office than when he took office. He falsely claimed that climate scientists "say the ocean will rise 1/8 of an inch over the next 200 to 300 years"; NOAA estimated average sea level rise along the U.S. coastline will be 10-12 inches in the next 30 years.

Speaking of border crossings by undocumented aliens, he said "I believe it's 10 million people coming in, not three or four million people", a claim for which there is no empirical basis. Likewise, his claim that the U.S.-Mexico border had been "erased" since Biden was sworn in, was also baseless. Trump falsely heralded completion of his border wall; in fact, the vast majority of the "new" barriers reinforced or replaced existing structures, and only about 47 miles were new primary barriers along the 1,900-mile border.

Trump said "I've gone decades, decades without a war, the first president to do it for that long a period"; however, he presided over U.S. involvement in wars in Afghanistan, Iraq and Syria, and was commander-in-chief for dozens of U.S. airstrikes. He claimed that when he began his term the U.S. had jet fighters that were 48 years old (and) bombers that were 60 years old – but not anymore"; in fact, the military continues to use B-52 bombers that are being outfitted with new Rolls-Royce engines to prolong their life even further. Trump was wrong in claiming that the U.S. takes longer than "any" country to count votes, belied by longer times in Indonesia (more than a month in 2019), Afghanistan (five months after a September 2019 vote), and Bosnia (weeks in fall 2022).

Public opinion
A June 2019 Gallup poll found that 34% of American adults think Trump "is honest and trustworthy".

A March 2020 Kaiser Family Foundation poll estimated that 19% of Democrats and 88% of Republicans trusted Trump to provide reliable information on COVID-19.

A May 2020 SRSS poll for CNN concluded that 36% of people in the U.S. trusted Trump on information about the COVID-19 outbreak. Only 4% of Democrats trusted that information from Trump, compared to 84% of Republicans.

In April 2022, Trump stated at a rally in Selma, North Carolina: "I think I'm the most honest human being, perhaps, that God ever created," prompting laughter from the crowd.

See also

 Fear: Trump in the White House
 Fire and Fury
 List of conspiracy theories promoted by Donald Trump
 Post-truth politics
 Reality distortion field
 The Making of Donald Trump
 Trump derangement syndrome
 Trumpism
 Truth Decay
 Truth sandwich
 Veracity of statements by Boris Johnson

References

Further reading

External links

Fact-checker archives
 Donald Trump at PolitiFact
 Donald Trump at FactCheck.org
 Donald Trump at The Washington Post
 Donald Trump at Toronto Star

Books

News media

Academic research
 

Articles containing video clips
Criticism of Donald Trump
Deception
Donald Trump controversies
Trump administration controversies
Trumpism
Truth
Disinformation operations